Oseberg South is an offshore oil field in the North Sea, located  from the coastline and  south of Oseberg oil field.  Oseberg Sør was discovered in 1984. The field was developed with a fixed production, drilling and quarters (PDQ) facility and is operated by Statoil. The first stage phase processing is done at the Oseberg Øst platform. The second and third phase processing of oil is done at the Oseberg Field Center and it is then transported to Sture Terminal in Norway through the Oseberg Transport System. The development of the Oseberg Sør was approved in 1977. Recent updates include approval of J structure which started producing in November 2006 and Oseberg Sør G Sentral which has been developed in 2009.

Technical features
It also includes a 100-bed capacity living quarters, first stage processing facilities, power generation and utility systems and a high performance drilling package. Production lifetime is estimated at 20 years.

See also

Grane oil field
Grane Oil Pipeline
North Sea oil
Oseberg East
Oseberg Transport System

References

External links
Picture of installation of topsides at Oseberg Sør
Statoil website
Map of Oseberg field from OLJEDIREKTORATET Norwegian Petroleum Directorate

ConocoPhillips oil and gas fields
Equinor oil and gas fields
ExxonMobil oil and gas fields
Oil fields in Norway
North Sea oil fields
TotalEnergies